Political entities in the 11th century BC – Political entities in the 9th century BC – Political entities by century

This is a list of  states or polities that existed in the 10th century BC.

Sovereign states

See also
List of Bronze Age states
List of Classical Age states
List of Iron Age states
List of states during Antiquity

References
 

-10
10th century BC-related lists